Like all municipalities of Puerto Rico, Culebra is subdivided into administrative units called barrios, which are roughly comparable to minor civil divisions, (and means wards or boroughs or neighborhoods in English). The barrios and subbarrios, in turn, are further subdivided into smaller local populated place areas/units called sectores (sectors in English). The types of sectores may vary, from normally sector to urbanización to reparto to barriada to residencial, among others. Some sectors appear in two barrios.

List of sectors by barrio

Culebra barrio-pueblo
Comunidad Clark
Sector Fulladosa
Sector Melones
Sector Sardinas I
Sector Sardinas II

Flamenco
Extensión Villa Muñeco
Sector Las Delicias
Sector Resaca
Sector Romana
Sector Villa Flamenco
Sector Villa Muñeco

Fraile
Condominio Costa Bonita
Extensión Barriada Clark
Sector Alturas de Soni
Sector Carenero
Sector Las Vacas

Playa Sardinas I
Égida Felipa Serrano

Playa Sardinas II
Sector Ensenada Honda
Sector Punta Aloe

San Isidro
There are no sectors in San Isidro barrio.

See also

 List of communities in Puerto Rico

References

Culebra
Culebra